Hapoel Nahlat Yehuda is an Israeli football club based in the Nahlat Yehuda neighbourhood of Rishon LeZion. The club currently plays in Liga Bet South A division.

History
The club was founded in 1976, and played in the lower divisions of Israeli football until the 1990s, when the club reached Liga Alef, the third tier of Israeli football.

Following the creation of the Israeli Premier League in 1999, Liga Alef was the fourth tier, up until 2009, when Liga Artzit (then the third tier) was closed, and Liga Alef regained its status as the third tier. the closest the club came to achieve promotion to Liga Artzit, was in the 2006–07 season, when they finished third in Liga Alef South division, one point behind Hapoel Kfar Shalem, which were eventually promoted, as the league winners, Hapoel Maxim Lod, were folded.

The club played in Liga Alef until the 2010–11 season, when they finished third bottom, and relegated to Liga Bet, following a defeat of 0–3 to F.C. Ortodoxim Lod in the Relegation play-offs.

Honours

League

Cups

References

External links
Hapoel Nahlat Yehuda Rishon LeZion  Israel Football Association 

Nahlat Yehuda
Nahlat Yehuda
Association football clubs established in 1976
1976 establishments in Israel
Sport in Rishon LeZion